Aleksandr Vladimirovich Popov (Russian: Алекса́ндр Влади́мирович Попо́в, born 16 November 1971), better known as Alexander Popov, is a former Russian swimmer. Widely considered the greatest sprint swimmer in history, Popov won gold in the 50-metre and 100 m freestyle at the 1992 Olympics and repeated the feat at the 1996 Olympics, and is the only male in Olympic games history to defend both titles. He held the world record in the 50 m for eight years, and the 100 m for six. In 2003, aged 31, he won 50 m and 100 m gold at the 2003 World Championships.

Swimming
Popov began swimming at age 8 at the Children and Youth Sports School of Fakel Sports Complex in Lesnoy, at that time afraid of water. However, his father insisted on him taking swimming lessons in that sports school, and in his own words, he has "been stuck there ever since". Popov started out as a backstroker but switched to freestyle when he joined Gennadi Touretski's squad in 1990 on the initiative by the head coach of the USSR National Team Gleb Petrov. He later moved from Russia to Australia to be with his coach.

Popov won the men's 50 m and 100 m freestyle in the Barcelona Olympics in 1992, and repeated his victories in the 1996 Atlanta Olympics, becoming the first man to do so since Johnny Weissmuller. He presented Touretski with his 1996 Olympic gold medal from the 100 m freestyle. "I have a title and I'm on the paper, but, you know, Gennadi hasn't gotten anything from Atlanta or from Barcelona," Popov said. "But I know how much this particular medal means for him, is worth for him."

One month after the Atlanta Olympics, he was stabbed in the abdomen with a knife during a dispute with three Moscow street vendors. The knife sliced his artery, grazed one of his kidneys and damaged the pleura, the membrane that encases the lungs. He had emergency surgery and spent three months in rehabilitation. At the 1997 European Championships in Seville, Spain, he successfully defended his 50 m and 100 m freestyle titles.

In 2000, he beat the world record in the 50-metre freestyle in a time of 21.64 at Russia's Olympic Trials in Moscow. Popov, considered one of the most technically sound swimmers of all time, took just 31 strokes to set the world mark, which would last nearly eight years.

Popov finished second in the 100 meter freestyle at the 2000 Olympics.

In the 2003 Barcelona World Championships, Popov once again made a clean sweep of the men's 50 m and 100 m freestyle events, citing that Barcelona would always be special to him, for it was there that for him, everything first began.

He announced his participation in the 2004 Athens Olympics. Moreover, he was the Flagbearer of Russia in the opening ceremony. Popov was the oldest competitor at the pool, and finished 9th in the men's 50 m and 18th in the 100 m freestyle.

He announced his retirement from the sport in January 2005.

Post swimming

Popov was elected a full member of the International Olympic Committee in December 1999. He also represents the athletes on the IOC Sport for All Commission and was elected directly as one of seven athletes to the IOC Athletes' Commission by the athletes participating in the 1996 Olympics. He was re-elected to the Athletes Commission at the 2000 Games and is now Honorary Secretary. He was awarded the 1996 Russian Medal of Honour for contributions to sport. He was also named Russian Athlete of the Year and European Sports Press Union Athlete of the Year in 1996.

In June 2003, he confirmed that he was permanently leaving Australia in early 2004 to live in Solothurn, Switzerland. He said the move followed the offer of a business proposition in Switzerland, once he had retired from swimming. He retained Touretski as a long-distance coach.

Popov earned both a bachelor's and a master's degree in sports coaching from the Russian Academy.

He is a spokesman for Omega SA alongside other swimmers such as Ian Thorpe.

He appeared at the closing ceremony of the Beijing Olympics after being elected a member of the IOC, presenting flowers to volunteers. He was named to the Evaluation Commission for the 2016 Summer Olympics.

In 2009 he served as chairman of the RC Lokomotiv Moscow rugby league club.

Since May 2009 he has been a member of the supervisory board of Adidas.

Personal life
In early 1997 he married Darya Shmeleva, a Russian Olympic swimmer he had dated since 1995. They have two sons, Vladimir (born 1997) and Anton (b. 2000), and a daughter, Mia (b. 22 December 2010).

Popov is a friend of wrestler Aleksandr Karelin.

Controversy
On 4 July 2019, the International Olympic Committee accused Alexander Popov, and eight other members of the IOC, of accepting bribes in order to secure their votes for Rio de Janeiro as host of the 2016 Summer Olympics. The former governor of Rio de Janeiro, Sérgio Cabral, contended in court that he paid $2 million to Lamine Diack, the former president of the International Association of Athletics Federation, which it was known as at the time, in order to secure votes. On 5 July 2019, Popov denied these allegations, citing that he did not take any money in return for his vote.

Honors and awards
 Order of Merit for the Fatherland, 3rd class
 Order of Friendship
 Honoured Master of Sports

See also
 List of members of the International Swimming Hall of Fame
 World record progression 50 metres freestyle
 World record progression 100 metres freestyle
 List of multiple Olympic medalists at a single Games
 List of multiple Olympic gold medalists
 List of multiple Summer Olympic medalists

References

External links
 

1971 births
Living people
People from Sverdlovsk Oblast
Soviet male swimmers
Russian male swimmers
Olympic swimmers of the Unified Team
Olympic swimmers of Russia
Swimmers at the 1992 Summer Olympics
Swimmers at the 1996 Summer Olympics
Swimmers at the 2000 Summer Olympics
Swimmers at the 2004 Summer Olympics
Olympic gold medalists for the Unified Team
Olympic silver medalists for the Unified Team
Olympic gold medalists for Russia
Olympic silver medalists for Russia
International Olympic Committee members
World record setters in swimming
Recipients of the Order "For Merit to the Fatherland", 3rd class
Honoured Masters of Sport of the USSR
Russian male freestyle swimmers
World Aquatics Championships medalists in swimming
Stabbing survivors
Rugby league administrators
Medalists at the FINA World Swimming Championships (25 m)
European Aquatics Championships medalists in swimming
Medalists at the 2000 Summer Olympics
Medalists at the 1996 Summer Olympics
Medalists at the 1992 Summer Olympics
Olympic gold medalists in swimming
Olympic silver medalists in swimming
Goodwill Games medalists in swimming
Russian expatriate sportspeople in Switzerland
Competitors at the 1998 Goodwill Games
Fifth convocation members of the State Duma (Russian Federation)